The Micropepsaceae are a family of bacteria.

References

Alphaproteobacteria
Bacteria families